Raul Zakirovich Dzhalilov (born 20 July 1994) is a Kyrgyzstani-Kazakhstani professional footballer who plays as an attacking midfielder for Kyrgyz Premier League club Alga Bishkek.

Career

As a youth player, Dzhalilov joined the youth academy of Russian top flight side Rubin.

Before the 2013 season, he signed for Sunkar in the Kazakhstani second division after playing for Kyrgyzstani club Alga.

Before the 2014 season, Dzhalilov signed for Tobol in the Kazakhstani top flight, where he made 72 appearances and scored 8 goals.

Before the 2020 season, he signed for Kazakhstani second division team Academy Ontustik.

Before the 2021 season, Dzhalilov signed for Zhetysu in the Kazakhstani top flight.

References

External links
 
 

1994 births
Living people
Sportspeople from Bishkek
Association football midfielders
Kazakhstani footballers
Kyrgyzstani footballers
Kazakhstan Premier League players
FC Zhetysu players
FC Tobol players
FC Alga Bishkek players